Wang Jianzhou (born December 1948 in Wenzhou, Zhejiang), is Chinese business executive. His roles included being the former Chairman of China Mobile.

Biography
Wang did his undergraduate and postgraduate studies both at Zhejiang University (ZJU). Wang received a master's degree of industrial management from ZJU in 1985. Wang also obtained a doctorate in business administration from the Hong Kong Polytechnic University.

Wang was the Chief Director of the Posts and Telecommunications Bureau of Zhejiang Province in Hangzhou. In 1996, Wang became a director in the Ministry of Posts and Telecommunications of People's Republic of China.

In 2001, Wang was appointed to be the President of the China Mobile Communications Corporation. In 2012, Wang stepped down "by reason of age".

In January 2013, The GSMA announced that it had appointed Jianzhou as a senior advisor to the firm.

See also
 China Mobile

References

External links

 Wang Jianzhou's biography at China Vitae 
 Wang Jianzhou Profile - Forbes.com 
 Mr. Wang Jianzhou: China Mobile won't build a wide range 3G network  
 China Mobile Limited - EXECUTIVE DIRECTORS: Mr. Wang Jianzhou  

1948 births
Living people
Businesspeople from Wenzhou
Zhejiang University alumni